Le Lisp (also Le_Lisp and Le-Lisp) is a programming language, a dialect of the language Lisp.

It was developed at the French Institute for Research in Computer Science and Automation (INRIA), to be an implementation language for a very large scale integration (VLSI) workstation being designed under the direction of Jean Vuillemin. Le Lisp also had to run on various incompatible platforms (mostly running Unix operating systems) that were used by the project. The main goals for the language were to be a powerful post-Maclisp version of Lisp that would be portable, compatible, extensible, and efficient.

Jérôme Chailloux led the Le Lisp team, working with Emmanuel St. James, Matthieu Devin, and Jean-Marie Hullot in 1980. The dialect is historically noteworthy as one of the first Lisp implementations to be available on both the Apple II and the IBM PC.

On 2020-01-08, INRIA agreed to migrate the source code to the 2-clause BSD License which allowed few native ports from ILOG and Eligis to adopt this license model.

References

External links
 , Eligis, for x86 processors
 Le Lisp at Computer History Museum's Software Preservation Group
 Le-Lisp Open Source repository on GitHub

Lisp programming language family
Lisp (programming language)